Canada Township may refer to:

 Township (Canada), a type of subdivision in certain parts of Canada 
 Canada Township, Labette County, Kansas, in Labette County, Kansas
 Canada Township, Jackson County, North Carolina, in Jackson County, North Carolina